Sushil Uzir (born 1 March 1957 in Gauhati, Assam) is an Indian cricketer who played domestic cricket for Assam cricket team. He is a right-handed batsman and Right-arm medium.
Uzir made his first-class debut for Assam in the 1975/76 Ranji Trophy. He played 27 first-class matches for Assam from 1975/76 to 1987/88.

References

External links

 

1957 births
Living people
Indian cricketers
Assam cricketers
People from Guwahati
Cricketers from Assam
People from Assam
Assamese people